is a Japanese actress, voice actress and singer. She played Tsumugi Kotobuki in the anime series K-On! about a high school girl band. The show launched her music career as she performed the opening and ending themes, and joined three other voice actresses as the music group Sphere.

Acting career
At the age of three years, Kotobuki, along with her parents, was caught up in the Great Hanshin earthquake. Not long after having seen a 1997 Japanese film entitled Chikyuu ga Ugoita Hi ("The Day the Earth Moved"), all of these events inspired Kotobuki to pursue her career as a voice actress.

Kotobuki played Tsumugi Kotobuki in K-On!, Karina Lyle/Blue Rose in Tiger & Bunny, Rikka Hishikawa/Cure Diamond in DokiDoki! PreCure, Mitsuko Kongō in A Certain Magical Index and A Certain Scientific Railgun, Yūko Nishi in A Channel, Lana and Cia from Hyrule Warriors, and Natsumi Aizawa in Natsuiro Kiseki, Touko Nanami in Bloom Into You, Asuka Tanaka in Hibike! Euphonium , Yoriko Fukase in A Whisker Away

Music career
Kotobuki performed the opening and ending themes of the 2009 anime series K-On!, alongside Aki Toyosaki, Yōko Hikasa, Satomi Satō and Ayana Taketatsu. She performed the opening theme for Hatsukoi Limited series, with Aki Toyosaki, Ayahi Takagaki and Haruka Tomatsu. The four are affiliated with Music Ray'n, an artist management and publishing group of Sony Music Entertainment. They are currently known as the musical group Sphere and released their first single, "Future Stream", on April 22, 2009.

Coupled with the release of her first album My Stride, Kotobuki had her first solo Japan-wide concert tour entitled Our Stride in 2012 spanning across four dates and venues starting from November 18 in Kobe's International House Kokusai Hall and ending on December 9 in Ōmiya's Sonic City Hall.

Kotobuki is said to be "the fastest learner on how to dance" among her peers as far as her being a member of Sphere goes so much that she even guides the other three members of Sphere on dancing. Even in singing, Kotobuki is said to learn just as fast, "a pro in harmonization" according to her fellow castmate in K-On!, Satomi Satō, and "someone who has good sense in pitch" according to one of K-Ons staff members in charge of music.

During her stint in both seasons for K-On!, she and her fellow cast members were involved in two live events, and just like the character she portrayed in K-On!, she was in charge of playing the keyboard in both occasions. She also played the keyboard on some of her own songs during her Our Stride solo concert tour and on Sphere's first 2013 live event, Music Rainbow 02. She also participated in the anime series Aikatsu! and was the voice actress of Kanzaki Mizuki.

Filmography

Live-action film 
2005 
Hibi – Young Kumiko Kamiyama

2006 
Ghost of Yesterday – Fumiko
Koufuku no Switch – Young Hitomi
Hinami – Mina, Satsuki

2008 
Bluebird – Michiru
-x- (Minus Kakeru Minus) – Rin Fujimoto

2013
Schoolgirl Complex: Broadcasting Club Edition – Ikumi Motonishi (School teacher)

2014
Kiki's Delivery Service – Jiji
Onodera no Otōto, Onodera no Ane – Asako Saitō

2019
Brave Father Online: Our Story of Final Fantasy XIV – Aru-chan (voice)

Anime series
2006
Red Garden – Student C, Grace A

2007
Kamichama Karin – Kirika (age 5)

2008
Kyōran Kazoku Nikki – Hijiri Yamaguchi
Birdy the Mighty: Decode – Kanae Kitamura

2009
First Love Limited – Rika Dobashi
K-On! – Tsumugi Kotobuki
Umi Monogatari: Anata ga Ite Kureta Koto – Kanon Miyamori
A Certain Scientific Railgun – Mitsuko Kongou
Yoku Wakaru Gendai Mahō – Kaho Sakazaki
Hell Girl: Triangle – Kaname Shimura
Sora no Manimani – Emiri, Youko Matoba, Hachiman, Sayaka Akiyama
Birdy the Mighty: Decode 02 – Kanae Kitamura, Mirun
Heaven's Lost Property – Tsukino Hououin
Guin Saga – Alumina

2010
Asobi ni iku yo! – Chaika
Chu-Bra!! – Yako Jingūji
Hyakka Ryōran Samurai Girls – Sen Tokugawa
K-On!! – Tsumugi Kotobuki
B Gata H Kei - Additional Voices
Otome Youkai Zakuro – Daidai
Mayoi Neko Overrun! – Young Takumi
Lilpri – Tenko Okamoto
Ōkami-san and Her Seven Companions – Chuutarou Nezumi
A Certain Magical Index II – Mitsuko Kongou
Demon King Daimao – Arnoul
The Legend of the Legendary Heroes – Naia Knolles (Kiefer's sister)
Yumeiro Patissiere – Dominic

2011
A Channel – Yūko Nishi
Coicent (OVA) – Toto
Guilty Crown – Kanon Kusama
Dog Days – Vert Far Breton
Manyū Hiken-chō – Chifusa Manyū
Ro-Kyu-Bu! – Natsuhi Takenaka
Softenni – Misaki Shidou
Tiger & Bunny – Karina Lyle/Blue Rose
Hanasaku Iroha – Eri Mizuno
Tamayura: Hitotose – Chihiro Miyoshi
Beelzebub – Yolda, Kaoru Umemiya
Wandering Son – Kobayashi
Horizon in the Middle of Nowhere – Gin Tachibana
Un-Go – Sayo Izawa

2012
Natsuiro Kiseki: Natsumi Aizawa
Mobile Suit Gundam AGE – Fram Nara
Medaka Box – Nekomi Nabeshima
Medaka Box Abnormal – Nekomi Nabeshima
Dog Days` – Vert Far Breton
Aikatsu! – Mizuki Kanzaki
Inazuma Eleven Go: Chrono Stone – Jeanne d'Arc
Hyouka – Henmi
Tari Tari – Youko Mizuno
Sukitte Ii na yo – Megumi Kitagawa
Sket Dance – Akina
Queen's Blade Rebellion – Izumi
Horizon in the Middle of Nowhere II – Gin Tachibana, Matsu
Pokémon: Black & White – Stella

2013
Dokidoki! PreCure – Rikka Hishikawa/Cure Diamond
Hyakka Ryōran Samurai Bride – Sen Tokugawa
A Certain Scientific Railgun S – Mitsuko Kongou
My Teen Romantic Comedy SNAFU – Minami Sagami
Valvrave the Liberator – Takahi Ninomiya
Tamayura: More Aggressive – Chihiro Miyoshi
Ro-Kyu-Bu! SS – Natsuhi Takenaka
Yuushibu – Herself

2014
Go! Go! 575 – Yuzu Yosano
Saki: Zenkoku-hen – Kyōko Suehara
Sekai Seifuku: Bōryaku no Zvezda – Miki Shirasagi/White Egret
Baby Steps – Natsu Takasaki
Pokémon: XY – Ellie
Majin Bone – Tomoko Ryūjin
Gundam Reconguista in G – Noredo Nug
Robot Girls Z – Imaichi Moenai Ko (Girl lacking in moe)
Girl Friend Beta – Saya Kagurazaka
Terra Formars – Rosa (Adolf's ex-wife)

2015
Baby Steps Season 2 – Natsu Takasaki
Dog Days`` – Vert Far Breton
Sound! Euphonium – Asuka Tanaka
Punchline – Ito Hikiotani
The Seven Deadly Sins – Vivian
Your Lie in April – Izumi
Tokyo Ghoul √A – Ukina
Akagami no Shirayukihime – Actress (ep 12)
Kamisama Minarai: Himitsu no Cocotama – Konoka Yamada

2016
Time Travel Girl – Waka Mizuki
Ange Vierge – Saya Sōgetsu
Sound! Euphonium 2 – Asuka Tanaka
Berserk – Rickert

2017
Case Closed – Eiko Ikeguchi (ep. 859)
Bungou Stray Dogs OVA – Aya
Re:Creators – Shunma Suruga
Akashic Records of Bastard Magic Instructor – Sera Silvers
Senki Zesshō Symphogear AXZ – Saint-Germain

2018
Bloom Into You – Touko Nanami

2019
Fairy Gone – "Sweety" Bitter Sweet
7 Seeds – Maria Miki
Senki Zesshō Symphogear XV – Saint-Germain

2020
A Certain Scientific Railgun T – Mitsuko Kongou

2021
Idoly Pride – Ai Komiyama

2022
Detective Conan – Mina Katsumata
Love All Play – Rika Mizushima
Tiger & Bunny 2 – Karina Lyle/Blue Rose
Fanfare of Adolescence – Miku Kashino
Legend of Mana: The Teardrop Crystal – Sandra

Anime films
2009 
Redline – Hime

2011 
K-On! The Movie – Tsumugi Kotobuki
Towa no Quon – Cyborg Delta AKA Hizuru Asuka
Heaven's Lost Property the Movie: The Angeloid of Clockwork – Tsukino Hououin

2012 
Pokémon the Movie: Black—Victini and Reshiram and White—Victini and Zekrom – Yorterrie
Fuse Teppō Musume no Torimonochō – Hamaji
Berserk Golden Age Arc I: The Egg of the King – Rickert
Berserk Golden Age Arc II: The Battle for Doldrey – Rickert
After School Midnighters – Mutsuko
Tiger & Bunny: The Beginning – Karina Lyle/Blue Rose

2013
A Certain Magical Index: The Movie – The Miracle of Endymion – Mitsuko Kongou
Berserk Golden Age Arc III: Descent – Rickert
Dokidoki! PreCure the Movie: Mana's Getting Married!!? The Dress of Hope Tied to the Future – Rikka Hishikawa/Cure Diamond
Pretty Cure All Stars New Stage 2 : Kokoro no Tomodachi – Rikka Hishikawa/Cure Diamond

2014
Tiger & Bunny: The Rising – Karina Lyle/Blue Rose
Pretty Cure All Stars New Stage 3 : Eien no Tomodachi – Rikka Hishikawa/Cure Diamond
Aikatsu!: The Movie – Mizuki Kanzaki

2015
Cyborg 009 Vs. Devilman – Eva Maria Parallels
Tamayura: Sotsugyou Shashin – Chihiro Miyoshi

2017
Lu Over the Wall – Yuho Ebina

2018
Flavors of Youth – Yi Lin

2019
Sound! Euphonium The Movie - Our Promise: A Brand New Day – Asuka Tanaka
Violet Evergarden: Eternity and the Auto Memory Doll – Isabella York
Hello World – Yiyi Xu

2020
A Whisker Away – Yoriko Fukase

Video games
2004
Mega Man – Cinnamon
2009
Final Fantasy XIII (PS3) – Serah Farron

2010
K-On! Houkago Live!! (PSP) – Tsumugi Kotobuki
Suzunone Seven! ~Rebirth Knot~ (PS2) – Mayo Shouno

2011
Final Fantasy Type-0 (PSP) – Kasumi Tobuki
Final Fantasy XIII-2 (PS3) – Serah Farron
Ro-Kyu-Bu! (PSP) – Natsuhi Takenaka
A Certain Magical Index (PSP) – Mitsuko Kongou

2012
Devil Summoner: Soul Hackers (3DS) – Hitomi Tono, Nemissa
YomeColle (Smartphone game) – Chifusa Manyū
Girl Friend Beta (Smartphone game) – Saya Kagurazaka
Mobile Suit Gundam AGE: Universe Accel / Cosmic Drive (PSP) – Fram Nara

2013
Tiger & Bunny: Heroes' Day (PSP) – Karina Lyle/Blue Rose
Horizon in the Middle of Nowhere Portable (PSP) – Gin Tachibana
Lightning Returns: Final Fantasy XIII (PS3) – Serah Farron
Aikatsu! Futari No My Princess (3DS) – Mizuki Kanzaki

2014
Ro-Kyu-Bu!: Naisho no Shutter Chance (Vita) – Natsuhi Takenaka
Suzunone Seven! Portable (PSP) – Mayo Shouno
Hyrule Warriors (Wii U) – Lana, Cia
Granblue Fantasy (Android, iOS, Browser) – Herja
Grimoire 〜Shiritsu Grimoire Mahou Gakuen〜 (Smartphone game) – Senri Wagatsuma
Heroes Placement (Smartphone game) – Obana Tonomine
Aikatsu! 365 Idol Days (3DS) – Mizuki Kanzaki

2015
Persona 4: Dancing All Night (Vita) – Kanami Mashita
Girl Friend Note (Smartphone rhythm game) – Saya Kagurazaka
Hyrule Warriors – Lana/Cia
Super Robot Wars BX – Fram Nara

2016
Hyrule Warriors Legends (3DS) – Lana, Cia
Aikatsu! Photo on Stage (Smartphone game) – Mizuki Kanzaki
Schoolgirl Strikers (Smartphone game) – Monica
Punch Line – Ito Hikiotani
Berserk and the Band of the Hawk (Multiple platforms) – Rickert

2017
Oshiro Project:RE – Tokugawa Osaka-jo
Precure Tsunagaru Pazurun – Rikka Hishikawa/Cure Diamond
Kirara Fantasia – Tsumugi Kotobuki, Yuuko

2018
Super Robot Wars X – Noredo Nug

2019
Gundam Extreme VS. 2 – Fram Nara, Noredo Nug

2023
Arknights – Qiu Bai

Tokusatsu
2016
Doubutsu Sentai Zyuohger – Nalia
Doubutsu Sentai Zyuohger the Movie: The Exciting Circus Panic! – Nalia
2017
Doubutsu Sentai Zyuohger vs. Ninninger the Movie: Super Sentai's Message from the Future – Nalia
Doubutsu Sentai Zyuohger Returns: Give Me Your Life! Earth Champion Tournament – Nalia

Theater
2014
 Tanin no Me – Belinda
 Eclipse – Hanezu, Young Seimei

Overseas dubbing

Live-action
Big Little Lies – Jane Chapman (Shailene Woodley)
Byzantium – Eleanor Webb (Saoirse Ronan)
Carrie – Nikki and Lizzi (Karissa and Katie Strain)
The Edge of Seventeen – Nadine Franklin (Hailee Steinfeld)
Gossip Girl – Ivy Dickens / Charlie Rhodes (Kaylee DeFer)
Hick – Luli McMullen (Chloë Grace Moretz)
I.T.  – Kaitlyn Regan (Stefanie Scott)
Les Misérables – Cosette (Ellie Bamber)
Mindscape – Anna Greene (Taissa Farmiga)
The Pillars of the Earth – Elizabeth (Skye Lourie)
Priest – Lucy (Lily Collins)
Safe – Mei (Catherine Chan)
Stuber – Nicole Manning (Natalie Morales)
Sucker Punch – Babydoll (Emily Browning)
We Are Lady Parts – Amina (Anjana Vasan)

Animation
How to Train Your Dragon (film) — Astrid Hofferson
Smurfs: The Lost Village – Smurfstorm
Thunderbirds Are Go – Tanusha "Kayo" Kyrano

Discography

Singles
"Shiny+" (September 15, 2010)
"Startline" (November 24, 2010)
"Dear my..." (September 14, 2011)
"Kokoro Sky" (April 11, 2012)
"Prism" (June 19, 2013)
"Pretty Fever" (November 20, 2013)
"Believe x" (Believe Cross) (April 16, 2014)
"black hole" (April 8, 2015)
"Candy Color Pop" (September 16, 2015)
"Bye Bye Blue" (March 2, 2016)
"Million Litmus" (December 7, 2016)
"save my world" (January 19, 2019)

Albums
 My Stride
 Tick
 emotion

References

External links
 
 
 

1991 births
Living people
Japanese child actresses
Japanese women pop singers
Japanese video game actresses
Japanese voice actresses
Musicians from Kobe
Voice actresses from Kobe
21st-century Japanese singers
21st-century Japanese women singers